Glenn Edward Sutko (born May 9, 1968) is a former Major League Baseball catcher from Atlanta, Georgia who played for the Cincinnati Reds. His major league career lasted only eleven games spread throughout the 1990 and 1991 seasons. He was drafted by the Reds in the 45th round of the 1987 amateur draft. He made his major league debut on October 3, 1990, against the Houston Astros and went 0-1. He played his last major league game the following year on July 17.

External links 

Cincinnati Reds players
Major League Baseball catchers
Nashville Sounds players
Living people
Baseball players from Atlanta
1968 births
Spartanburg Methodist Pioneers baseball players
Billings Mustangs players
Greensboro Hornets players
Cedar Rapids Reds players
Chattanooga Lookouts players
Winston-Salem Spirits players
New Orleans Pelicans (baseball) players
New Orleans Zephyrs players
Beloit Brewers players
El Paso Diablos players